The Malta Open is an annual darts tournament on the WDF circuit that began in 1986.

Results

Men's

Women's

Youth's

Tournament records
 Most wins 4:  Andy Keen,  John Michael. 
 Most Finals 6:  Andy Keen. 
 Most Semi Finals 10:  Andy Keen. 
 Most Quarter Finals 13:  Andy Keen. 
 Most Appearances 14:  Andy Keen. 
 Most Prize Money won €5,748:  Andy Keen. 
 Youngest Winner age 20:   Jermaine Wattimena. 
 Oldest Winner age 60:  Mark Layton.

See also
List of BDO ranked tournaments
List of WDF tournaments

References

1974 establishments in Malta
Darts tournaments
Darts in Malta